Henry Goring may refer to:
 Sir Henry Goring, 2nd Baronet (1622–1702), English barrister and politician, MP for Sussex and Steyning
Henry Goring (1646–1685), MP for New Shoreham and Bramber and Steyning
Sir Henry Goring, 4th Baronet (1679–1731), MP for Steyning and Horsham
Sir Henry Goring, 2nd Baronet, 1st creation (c. 1618–1671), of the Goring baronets

See also
Harry Goring (disambiguation)